The 1912–13 season was the 14th season for FC Barcelona.

Summary
This season was one of the most successful ones in the club's history, as Barcelona clinched its second treble after winning the Catalan championship, Copa del Rey and Pyrenees Cup). However, the former two were organized by Barcelona themselves as a rival competition to those organized by the Spanish FA, and even though they are considered official too, it still stains this treble as a lesser achievement than the previous one in the 1909–10. Furthermore, Barça was actually knocked out from the 1913 Pyrenees Cup after a 1–3 loss to RCD Espanyol in the semi-finals, but they managed to have the result annulled through protests, and then in the final they comfortably won 7–2, with braces from José Berdié and Paulino Alcántara. Meanwhile, in the 1913 UECF Copa del Rey Final, Barcelona needed three games to beat Real Sociedad as both legs ended with a draw (2–2 and 0–0), and then beat 2–1 in the play-off with goals from Berdié and new-signing Apolinario Rodríguez. This season also saw one of the best players of the club join: Paulino Alcántara, the youngest player (15 years old) to have made his debut with the first team.

Squad

Results 

 
 On day 2, the match was played against Avenç, suspended for climatological reasons at 20 minutes when the score was 0-0.
 The championship did not end and Barcelona was awarded as the winner.

References

External links

FC Barcelona seasons
Barcelona